Make It or Break It ( MIOBI) is an American teen/family drama television series that focused on the lives of teen gymnasts who strived to make it to the Olympic Games in 2012. The series was inspired by Touchstone's 2006 teen comedy-drama film Stick It. It premiered on ABC Family on June 22, 2009, with 2.5 million viewers.The series ended after Season 3. The show was picked up for an additional 10 episodes on July 27, 2009, which started airing on January 4, 2010, bringing the total number of episodes in the first season to 20. In January 2010, the show was renewed for a second season, which premiered on June 28, 2010 at 10 pm. Starting on July 13, 2010, new episodes aired following Pretty Little Liars. The show's second season resumed after a six-month hiatus on March 28, 2011. The series was renewed for a third season on September 16, 2011, which premiered on March 26, 2012. It was announced on April 26, 2012, that the series had ended and the third season would be the final season. The series finale aired on May 14, 2012.

Internationally, the show aired on E4 in the United Kingdom, Zee Café in India, Fox8 in Australia, ABC Spark in Canada, RTM2 in Malaysia, and on TV2 in New Zealand.

Make It or Break It was created by Holly Sorensen who, along with Paul Stupin and John Ziffren, served as the show's executive producers. The stunt doubles were former elite, Olympian or NCAA champion gymnasts.

Plot
Payson Keeler (Ayla Kell), Kaylie Cruz (Josie Loren), Lauren Tanner (Cassie Scerbo), and newcomer Emily Kmetko (Chelsea Hobbs) are elite-level gymnasts training for the 2012 Summer Olympics at a gym called "The Rock." The girls' futures are thrown into turmoil when their head coach, Marty Walsh (Erik Palladino), is blackmailed out of his job and is forced to move to a rival gym. It is revealed later that Kaylie's mother (Rosa Blasi) and Marty were having an affair and he left to keep the secret from being exposed. All four girls harbor secrets they must conceal for the sake of their athletic careers. Eventually, they put aside their differences in time to leave for nationals. Payson is favorite to win, but after a fall on the uneven bars, she fractures her spine and is told she can never do gymnastics again. The other three receive spots on the National Team, but clash with the head of the National Gymnastics Committee, Ellen Beals (Michelle Clunie), who prizes obedience to her authority and feels threatened by The Rock girls' independence. To get The Rock girls recognized as being international standard, The Rock holds a private meet between them and the Chinese National Team. Working together, the girls get five medals, more than the U.S. National Team got in Beijing.

In the second season, the girls are joined at The Rock by superstar male gymnast Austin Tucker (Zane Holtz). Payson, who has undergone surgery, attempts to revitalize her gymnastic career and becomes romantically involved with her coach Sasha Belov. The Kmetko family struggles financially with the loss of Emily's scholarship. The girls compete at trials for the World Championships and all four make the Worlds team. Emily is forced to wear an ankle monitor due to her probation after being caught stealing. The other girls train for the World Gymnastics Competition, a task made harder by the presence of their arch enemy, Kelly Parker, at The Rock. In the season two finale, the four girls lead the team to the World Competition in Rio de Janeiro, where they win team gold.

Season Three opens with Payson, Lauren, and Kaylie heading to the American Olympic Training Center as they prepare for the 2012 London Olympics. They deal with a new coach and teammates, including up-and-coming gymnast Jordan Randall, whose presence causes tension within the group. Coach Mac pairs up the girls, forcing Kaylie to live and work with Kelly Parker and Lauren to work with Payson. Kelly is not good enough for the Olympics and leaves gymnastics. Austin does not make the Olympic Team and blames Kaylie. Jordan reveals that a former coach molested her when she was young. Desperate to ensure her spot on the team, Wendy drugs Kaylie with a cold medicine containing a banned substance. After Austin and Kaylie reunite, then Lauren, Payson, and Jordan tell the NGO that they are boycotting Olympic tryouts unless Kaylie is allowed to perform. Lauren discovers the secret Wendy has been hiding and exposes her, getting Wendy kicked out. The season three finale culminates with the five girls, Payson, Lauren, Kaylie, Jordan, and Colleen, being chosen to represent the U.S. in the Olympics.

Cast and characters

Main cast and characters

Recurring cast and characters

Episodes

U.S. Nielsen ratings
The following is a table with the average estimated number of viewers per episode, each season of Make It or Break It on ABC Family.

DVD releases
Walt Disney Studios Home Entertainment released the first ten episodes in a set entitled Make It or Break It – Volume 1: Extended Edition. Bonus material includes deleted scenes, the never-before-seen extended finale, and the featurette, "Making It", which shows how the stars manage the acting with the difficult stunts they do.

Awards and nominations

See also
Stick It, an American teen-comedy-drama film in 2006
Code of Points (artistic gymnastics)

References

External links
 
 

 
2009 American television series debuts
2012 American television series endings
2000s American teen drama television series
2010s American teen drama television series
ABC Family original programming
English-language television shows
Gymnastics mass media
Television series about families
Television series about teenagers
Television shows set in Colorado
Television series by Disney–ABC Domestic Television